Stenocorus vestitus (also known as Flower longhorn) is a species of beetle in the family Cerambycidae. Just like Stenocorus meridianus, the females of this species are black coloured while males are brown.

References

Lepturinae